Sanganer railway station is a railway station in Jaipur district, Rajasthan. Its code is SNGN. It serves Sanganer town. The station consists of 3 platforms. Passenger, Express trains halt here.

Trains

The following trains halt at Sanganer railway station in both directions:

 Kota–Jaipur Express
 Bhopal–Jaipur Express

References

Railway stations in Jaipur district
Jaipur railway division